Florac Trois Rivières (literally 'Florac Three Rivers') is a commune in the department of Lozère, southern France. The municipality was established on 1 January 2016 by merger of the former communes of Florac and La Salle-Prunet. It is the seat (sous-préfecture) of the arrondissement of Florac.

Population

See also 
Communes of the Lozère department

References 

Communes of Lozère
Subprefectures in France
Populated places established in 2016
2016 establishments in France
Gévaudan